Phytoecia gaubilii is a species of beetle in the family Cerambycidae. It was described by Mulsant in 1851. It is known from Tunisia and Algeria.

Varietas
 Phytoecia gaubilii var. innotata Pic, 1898
 Phytoecia gaubilii var. separata Pic, 1895
 Phytoecia gaubilii var. griseipes Pic, 1890
 Phytoecia gaubilii var. impunctata Pic, 1895
 Phytoecia gaubilii var. gabilloti Pic, 1891
 Phytoecia gaubilii var. peregrina Reiche, 1877

References

Phytoecia
Beetles described in 1851